The Castillo Formation is an Early Miocene (Burdigalian, Colhuehuapian to Santacrucian in the SALMA classification) geologic formation in the Falcón Basin of Venezuela. The formation unconformably overlies the Matatere, Misoa, El Paují and Jarillal Formations. The Castillo Formation is overlain by Quaternary alluvium and in places by the Capadare Formation. The formation, deposited in a calm near-shore lagoonal brackish environment, with possibly fluvial influence, has provided a rich assemblage of fossil crocodylians, turtles, giant sloths and various types of fish.

Description 
The Castillo Formation crops out cover a wide semicircular area that extends through the northwestern Venezuelan states of Falcón and Lara. During Oligocene to Miocene times, the formation formed the northwest to southeast edge of the Falcón Basin. The Castillo Formation at Cerro La Cruz comprises  of clayey marls, interbedded with numerous thin (less than ) hardground units. The strata are underlain and overlain by sandstones, and the upper  are gypsiferous.

The formation was deposited in a calm near-shore marine to brackish lagoonal environment with possibly fluvial influence. Elements of the fauna are consistent with the hypothesis that a tributary and/or delta of the Orinoco existed in this area of northwestern Venezuela during Early Miocene times. Other authors did not find convincing results to support this hypothesis.

Fossil content 
In the formation, apart from corals, fossils of the giant sloth Baraguatherium takumara, the turtle Chelus colombiana, the crocodylians Siquisiquesuchus venezuelensis, Purussaurus, Caiman, Gryposuchus, and indeterminate other crocodylians, and the pelican-like Pelagornis sp. have been found. The pelican-like fossil is the oldest of South America.

Other fossils reported from the formation are:

 silky shark (Carcharhinus falciformis)
 wahoo (Acanthocybium sp.)
 barracuda (Sphyraena sp.)
 Carcharhinus cf. obscurus 
 Carcharhinus cf. perezi
 Hemipristis serra
 aff. Prosqualodon australis
 Bairdemys sp.
 Rhinoptera sp.
 Scirrotherium sp.
 Arecaceae indet.
 Astrapotheriidae indet.
 Iniidae indet.
 Litopterna indet.
 Mylodontidae indet.
 Platanistoidea indet.
 Squalidae indet.
 Tardigrada indet.
 Trionychoidea indet.

See also 
 Urumaco
 Honda Group
 South American land mammal ages

References

Bibliography

Further reading 
 C. A. Brochu and A. D. Rincón. 2004. A gavialoid crocodylian from the Lower Miocene of Venezuela. Special Papers in Palaeontology 71:61-79
 R. M. Feldmann and C. E. Schweitzer. 2004. Decapod Crustaceans from the Lower Miocene of North-Western Venezuela (Cerro La Cruz, Castillo Formation). Special Papers in Palaeontology 71:7-22
 M. R. Sánchez Villagra, R. J. Asher, A. D. Rincón, A. A. Carlini, P. Meylan and R. W. Purdy. 2004. New faunal reports for the Cerro La Cruz locality (lower Miocene), north-western Venezuela. Special Papers in Palaeontology 71:105-112
 M. R. Sánchez Villagra, R. J. Burnham, D.C. Campbell, R.M. Feldmann, E.S. Gaffney, R.S. Kay, R. Lozsan, R. Purdy, and J.G.M. Thewissen. 2000. A new near-shore marine fauna and flora from the early Neogene of northwestern Venezuela. Journal of Paleontology 74(5):957-968

Geologic formations of Venezuela
Neogene Venezuela
Burdigalian
Miocene Series of South America
Colhuehuapian
Santacrucian
Marl formations
Shallow marine deposits
Fluvial deposits
Lagoonal deposits
Evaporite deposits
Fossiliferous stratigraphic units of South America
Paleontology in Venezuela
Geography of Falcón
Geography of Lara (state)